The 2021 Open International de Tennis de Roanne was a professional tennis tournament played on indoor hard courts. It was the first edition of the tournament which was part of the 2021 ATP Challenger Tour. It took place in Roanne, France between 8 and 14 November 2021.

Singles main-draw entrants

Seeds

 1 Rankings are as of 1 November 2021.

Other entrants
The following players received wildcards into the singles main draw:
  Arthur Cazaux
  Giovanni Mpetshi Perricard
  Benoît Paire

The following player received entry into the singles main draw using a protected ranking:
  Julien Cagnina

The following player received entry into the singles main draw as an alternate:
  Kyrian Jacquet

The following players received entry from the qualifying draw:
  Gabriel Debru
  Calvin Hemery
  Georgii Kravchenko
  Alexey Vatutin

The following players received entry as lucky losers:
  Vladyslav Orlov
  Jelle Sels
  Luca Vanni

Champions

Singles

  Hugo Grenier def.  Hiroki Moriya 6–2, 6–3.

Doubles

 Lloyd Glasspool /  Harri Heliövaara def.  Romain Arneodo /  Albano Olivetti 7–6(7–5), 6–7(5–7), [12–10].

References

2021 ATP Challenger Tour
2021 in French tennis
November 2021 sports events in France